Ann Anderson (born 1952) is an American educator and politician and who served as a member of the Washington State Senate, representing the 42nd district from 1987 to 1998. A member of the Republican Party, she ran for Washington State Commissioner of Public Lands in 1992, losing to Democrat Jennifer Belcher in an election that saw historic results for Washington women, especially Democrats. In 1996, she ran for lieutenant governor and was defeated by Democrat Brad Owen.

References 

Living people
1952 births
Politicians from Yakima, Washington
People from Whatcom County, Washington
Republican Party Washington (state) state senators
Women state legislators in Washington (state)
20th-century American politicians
20th-century American women politicians
Central Washington University alumni
21st-century American women